An Esperantist is a person who speaks, reads or writes Esperanto. According to the Declaration of Boulogne, a document agreed upon at the first World Esperanto Congress in 1905, an Esperantist is someone who speaks Esperanto and uses it for any purpose.

Lists of famous Esperantists

Important Esperantists 

 Muztar Abbasi, Pakistani scholar, patron in chief of PakEsA, translated the Qur'an and many other works into Esperanto
 William Auld, eminent Scottish Esperanto poet and nominee for the Nobel Prize in Literature
 Julio Baghy, poet, member of the Academy of Esperanto and "Dad" ("Paĉjo") of the Esperanto movement
 Henri Barbusse, French writer, honorary president of the first congress of the Sennacieca Asocio Tutmonda
 Kazimierz Bein, "Kabe", prominent Esperanto activist and writer who suddenly left the Esperanto movement
 Émile Boirac, French writer and first president of the Esperanto language committee (later the Academy of Esperanto)
 Antoni Grabowski, Polish chemical engineer, the father of Esperanto poetry
 Lou Harrison, American composer of Esperanto music and translator of Sanskrit texts into Esperanto
 Julia Isbrücker, Dutch Esperantist
 Boris Kolker, Esperantist scholar and key member of the Academy of Esperanto
 Georges Lagrange, French Esperantist writer
 John Edgar McFadyen, Scottish theologist and linguist
 Frederic Pujulà i Vallés, pioneer of Esperanto in Spain
 Sándor Szathmári, leading figure of Esperanto literature
 L. L. Zamenhof, Polish ophthalmologist, inventor of Esperanto

Politicians 

 Joseph Stalin, General Secretary of the Communist Party of the Soviet Union, was said to have studied Esperanto by Leon Trotsky, though he later killed many Esperantists
 Kazimierz Badowski, member of the Communist Party of Poland, promoted Esperanto as part of Trotskyist movement
 Richard Bartholdt, U.S. Representative from Missouri
 Robert Cecil, 1st Viscount Cecil of Chelwood, one of the architects of the League of Nations, awarded the Nobel Peace Prize
 Parley Parker Christensen, Utah and California politician
 Willem Drees, Dutch politician, Prime Minister of the Netherlands (1948–1958)
 Heinz Fischer, President of the Republic of Austria
 Małgorzata Handzlik, Polish member of the European Parliament
 Ho Chi Minh, president of North Vietnam
 Jean Jaurès, French politician. He proposed to the International Socialist Congress at Stuttgart in 1907 the use of Esperanto for the information diffused by the Brussels Office of the organization. 
 Franz Jonas, President of the Republic of Austria, Secretary of the Austrian Laborist Esperantist League and founder of Internacio de Socialistaj Esperantistoj ("International of Socialist Esperantists")
 Graham Steele, Canadian lawyer, author, and former politician
 Josip Broz Tito, head of state of Yugoslavia

Writers 
 Anna Löwenstein, British Esperantist, writer, teacher
 Nadija Hordijenko Andrianova, Ukrainian writer and translator
 Maria Angelova, Bulgarian poet
 Ba Jin, prolific Chinese novelist and chairman of Chinese Writer Association
 Henri Barbusse, French writer, and honorary president of the first congress of the Sennacieca Asocio Tutmonda
 Louis de Beaufront, Esperantist writer
 Gerrit Berveling, Dutch Esperantist poet, translator and editor of the Esperanto literary review, Fonto
 Marjorie Boulton, British writer and poet in English and Esperanto; researcher and writer
 Jorge Camacho, Spanish Esperantist writer
 Vasili Eroshenko, Russian writer, Esperantist, linguist, and teacher
 Petr Ginz, native Esperanto speaking boy who wrote an Esperanto-Czech dictionary but later died in a concentration camp at age 16. His drawing of the Moon was carried aboard . His diary appears in Czech, Spanish, Catalan and Esperanto, and was recently published in English.
 Don Harlow, American Esperantist writer and webmaster of the United States Esperanto web-site.
 Hector Hodler, Swiss journalist, translator, organizer, and philanthropist
 Hans Jakob, Swiss writer
 Kálmán Kalocsay, Hungarian surgeon, poet, translator, and editor
 Lena Karpunina, Tajik Esperantist short story writer
 Ikki Kita, Japanese fascist author, intellectual and political philosopher 
 Georges Lagrange, French Esperanto writer, member of Academy of Esperanto
 Nikolai Vladimirovich Nekrasov, Esperantist writer and translator of the Soviet Union
 Mauro Nervi, Italian poet in the Esperanto language
 Edmond Privat, Swiss author, journalist, university professor, and movement activist
 João Guimarães Rosa, Brazilian novelist, short story writer and diplomat
 Cezaro Rossetti, Scottish Esperantist writer
 Lazër Shantoja, Albanian catholic saint, writer and translator
 René de Saussure, Swiss writer and activist
 Teodoro Schwartz, Hungarian Jewish doctor, lawyer, author and editor
 William Thomas Stead, well-known philanthropist, journalist and pacifist who was aboard the RMS Titanic when it sank.
 Þórbergur Þórðarson (Thorbergur Thortharson), Icelandic writer and Esperantist
 J. R. R. Tolkien.
 Leo Tolstoy, Russian writer and philosopher, who claimed he learned how to write Esperanto after two hours of study
 Julian Tuwim, Polish poet and translator.
 Vladimir Varankin, Russian writer
 Jules Verne, French author, incorporated Esperanto into his last unfinished work
 Qian Xuantong, Chinese writer and linguist who pushed for the abolition of Classical Chinese, and supported the substitution of Spoken Chinese with Esperanto 
 Kenji Miyazawa, Japanese poet and author of children's literature. Author of Night on the Galactic Railroad (銀河鉄道の夜).

Scientists 

 Daniel Bovet, Italian pharmacologist and winner of the 1957 Nobel Prize in Physiology or Medicine, learned Esperanto as a first language
 Sidney S. Culbert, American linguist and psychologist
 Bertalan Farkas, Hungarian cosmonaut
 Louis Lumière, French inventor of cinema, said: "The use of Esperanto could have one of the happiest consequences in its effects on international relations and the establishment of peace."
 Fran Novljan, contributed to the promotion of Esperanto in Yugoslavia.
 Wilhelm Ostwald, German Nobel laureate for his seminal work in chemical catalysis
 Mark Pallen, British microbiologist
 Claude Piron, Esperantist, psychologist, and linguist, translator for the United Nations
 Reinhard Selten, German economist and winner of the 1994 Nobel Memorial Prize in Economics because of his work on game theory. He has authored two books in Esperanto on that subject.
 Leonardo Torres y Quevedo, Spanish civil engineer and mathematician.
 Yrjö Väisälä, Finnish astronomer, discovered asteroids 1421 Esperanto and 1462 Zamenhof
 John C. Wells, British phonetician and Esperanto teacher
 Vladimir Köppen, Russian geographer of German descent
 Marcel Minnaert,  Belgian astronomer who worked in Utrecht
 Seok Joo-myung, Korean ecologist who studied and identified native butterflies of Korea
 Claude Roux, French lichenologist and mycologist

Others 

 Baháʼí Faith adherents, many of whom have been involved with Esperanto (see Baháʼí Faith and auxiliary language). Lidia Zamenhof was a Baháʼí. Several leading Baháʼís have spoken Esperanto, most notably the Son of Bahá'u'lláh, `Abdu'l-Bahá (see John Esslemont).
 Rudolf Carnap, German-born philosopher.
 Onisaburo Deguchi, one of the chief figures of the Oomoto religious movement in Japan and president of the Universala Homama Asocio ("Universal Human-love Association")
 Alfred Fried, recipient of a Nobel Peace Prize and author of a textbook on Esperanto
 Ebenezer Howard, known for his  Garden Cities of To-morrow (1898), the description of a utopian city in which people live harmoniously together with nature.
 Pope John Paul II, gave several speeches using Esperanto during his career
 Franko Luin, Swedish type designer of Slovene nationality
 John Eyton Bickersteth Mayor, English classical scholar, gave a historic speech against Esperanto reformists at the World Congress of Esperanto held at Cambridge
 Alexander Nedoshivin, Russian tax specialist, one of the founders of the Esperanto Society at Kaunas, Lithuania
 William Main Page, Secretary of Edinburgh Esperanto Society, editor and author
 László Polgár, Hungarian chess teacher
 Susan Polgar, Hungarian-American chess grandmaster, taught Esperanto by her father László
 George Soros, Hungarian-American billionaire and son of Esperantist parents. ("Soros", a name selected by his father to avoid persecution, means "will soar" in Esperanto.) 
 Daniel Tammet, British autistic savant. He has stated Esperanto is one of the ten languages he speaks.
 Marcelle Tiard, French Esperantist who co-founded the Union of Esperantist Women.
 Antoon Jozef Witteryck, Belgian publisher and instructor

See also
Esperanto culture
Interhelpo

Sources
 This page has been translated from the article :fr:Espérantiste on the French Wikipedia, accessed on June 13, 2006.
 Information on William Thomas Stead from the Esperanto Vikipedio article.

References

External links
 100 eminentaj esperantistoj "100 eminent Esperantists" (eo)

Esperanto
 
Lists of people by language